Otto Wrede  (2 September 1851 in Anjala – 15 February 1936) was a Finnish politician. He was a member of the Senate of Finland.

1851 births
1936 deaths
People from Kouvola
People from Uusimaa Province (Grand Duchy of Finland)
Swedish-speaking Finns
Finnish people of German descent
19th-century Finnish nobility
Swedish People's Party of Finland politicians
Finnish senators
Members of the Diet of Finland
20th-century Finnish nobility